Pieter van Kouwenhoorn aka Pieter Kouwenhoorn (1599 in Haarlem – c. 21 May 1654 in Leiden) (fl. 1620s – 1630s) was a Dutch botanical illustrator. Kouwenhoorn was a glass painter working in Haarlem and Leiden in the Netherlands, and was one of the teachers of the painter Gerard Dou (1613–1675) and Hendrick Jansz. van der Smient (c. 1600 – 1655). He also painted landscapes, portraits and mythological subjects.

He was buried on 21 May 1654 from the 'Hooglandse Kerk' in Leiden.

Florilegia

"Verzameling van Bloemen naar de Natuur geteekend door Pieter van Kouwenhoorn". Dating from the 1630s this album has 46 paintings with plant names given in Latin, French and German.

References

Botanical illustrators